The Two Mothers (Italian: Le due madri) is a 1938 Italian drama film directed by Amleto Palermi and starring Vittorio De Sica, María Denis and Renato Cialente.

It was shot at the Cinecittà Studios in Rome. The film's sets were designed by Gastone Medin. It was released in the United States in 1940, and is sometimes dated by that year.

Cast

References

Bibliography 
 Bert Cardullo. Screening the Stage: Studies in Cinedramatic Art. Peter Lang, 2006.

External links 
 
 The Two Mothers at Variety Distribution

1938 drama films
Italian drama films
1938 films
1930s Italian-language films
Films directed by Amleto Palermi
Films shot at Cinecittà Studios
Italian black-and-white films
Films scored by Alessandro Cicognini
1930s Italian films